Allobates caeruleodactylus is a species of frog in the family Aromobatidae.
It is endemic to the Amazonas state of Brazil.
Its natural habitats are tropical moist lowland forest, rivers, freshwater marshes, and intermittent freshwater marshes.
It is threatened by habitat loss.

References

caeruleodactylus
Endemic fauna of Brazil
Amphibians of Brazil
Taxonomy articles created by Polbot
Amphibians described in 2001